Matthias Schwarz (born 28 December 1987) is a German footballer who plays as a midfielder for FC Alsterbrüder.

He joined VfB Stuttgart in July 2009 from FC Ingolstadt 04. Prior to this, he played for Bayern Munich II.

References

External links
 

1987 births
Living people
People from Miltenberg
Sportspeople from Lower Franconia
German footballers
Association football midfielders
2. Bundesliga players
3. Liga players
FC Bayern Munich II players
FC Ingolstadt 04 players
VfB Stuttgart II players
Kickers Offenbach players
Footballers from Bavaria